The Karnataka State Film Awards 2008–09, presented by Government of Karnataka, to felicitate the best of Kannada Cinema released in the year 2008-09.

Lifetime achievement award

Jury 

The awardees were chosen by a jury headed by veteran director H. R. Bhargava from the 73 films shortlisted. The panel consisted of nine-member team.

Film Awards

Other Awards

References

Karnataka State Film Awards